Justice Wells may refer to:

Alexander Wells (California judge), associate justice of the Supreme Court of California
Charles T. Wells, associate justice of the Supreme Court of Florida
Ebenezer T. Wells, associate justice of the Supreme Court of Colorado
John Wells (Massachusetts judge), associate justice of the Massachusetts Supreme Judicial Court
Thomas Wells (Rhode Island judge), associate justice of the Rhode Island Supreme Court
Thomas Wells (judge) (c. 1888–1954), judge of the Northern Territory Supreme Court

See also
Judge Wells (disambiguation)